In the 21st century, Ethiopia is still incapable to foster institutions to boost scientific and technological activities and maintaining good governmental policy to encourage development. The sole organization responsible for scientific and technological interests is the Science and Technology Information Center and the Ethiopian Space Science and Technology Institute for aerospace and space science programs.

Ethiopia is known for use of traditional medicine since millennia. According to British Ethiopianist Richard Pankhurst, beginning in Axumite era in 849, the first epidemic occurred and traditional medicine uncertainly passed through every stage of diseases and epidemics that occurred throughout Ethiopian history. Western implementation of modern medicine began under Emperor Menelik II with numerous medical envoys consisted mostly of Italians and Russians citizens and the use mainly preserved to foreign missionaries and urban elites at that time. Ethiopia was ranked 126th in the Global Innovation Index in 2021.

Overview
70% of university students involved practicing study science and engineering subjects, for example the innovative of incubator have led major technological concepts. Like other least developing countries, Ethiopia still suffers from resources deficiency to allocate science and technology facilities. This is primarily due to lack of government initiatives on policy, and characterized the situation more futile underdevelopment, i.e. unnecessary duplication of efforts, program redundancy, uneconomical/wasteful use of limited resources are basic factors to reduce the development.

Under Transitional Government based on Charter and the Economic Policy, science and technology issued for advancement to enhance their contribution to national economic development.

Information technology
Information technology was sponsored by government since 1975 with an establishment of the Ethiopian Science and Technology Commission (ESTC) in Proclamation No. 62/1975. IBM first introduced to Ethiopia in 1962 with accounting machine introduced in that year was model 1421/814 where a very slow printer attached to it. Programming was done using writing panel, which also needed expertized engineers.

In 1963, IBM introduced semi-mechanical accounting machine at the Economic Commission for Africa (ECA) followed by an introduction of auto code 1440 model, commissioned by the Ethiopian Electric Light and Power Authority.  Although the exact date was unknown, an electronic data-processing system, IBM model 360/20, a punched card system was introduced between 1965 and 1970, with capacity of 8–16 KB. Alteration from card to tape-disk system was made in 1970s, with system 3/10. This system relied on magnetic tape reading 1,000 cards with monolithic capacity ranging from 32 to 64 KB, comparing to 250 cards per minute of system 360/20. The first programming language was Report Program Generator, which served for long time in Ethiopia until 1986.

As suppliers increased competition, major technological changes attracted attention to end users and demand for viable systems questioned. To resolve the problem, IBM introduced system 34,36 model 4361 between 1981 and 1986, hence transiting from card to magnetic system.

NCR Corporation introduced with the introduction of cash registers and later mechanical accounting machines (NCR models 2000 and 3000), and major apparatuses such as payroll for building. NCR introduced electronic systems like 399 and 499, for the same purpose. The first NCR model minicomputer was installed in 1976, with 64 KB of main memory and 9.6 MB of hard disk. The corporation also installed 850 minicomputer between 1977 and 1984. It then ensued by number of installation.

Electronics industry were still underdevelopment, some efforts such as radio receiver sets assembly was initiated. Sophisticated systems such as radio communication, telecommunication, and communication and navigational tools were operational in use. In 1983, a report suggested that 63% of electronic consumers imports were for telecommunication and broadcasting equipment. In 1988, 280 computers, mostly personal computers, were imported to Ethiopia.

Ethiopia was ranked 126th in the Global Innovation Index in 2021.

Ethiopian Telecommunication Authority
In order to provide national and international telecommunication services, the Ethiopian Telecommunication Authority (ETA) was established in January 1953 led by General Manager, who is chief executive under the direction of board of directors whose chairman is the Minister of Transport and Communication by virtue. It is state-owned and has administrative and financial autonomy.

The service provided telephony, telegraphy and telex while broadcasting held by ETA until its transfer to Ministry of Information and Guidance in 1977. ETA contributed for digitalization in 1989, booming integrated services digital network. It also implementing computerized management information system.

Ethiopian Space Science and Technology Institute

In 2004, the Ethiopian Space Science and Technology Institute (ESSTI) established to create observatory in Entoto Mountains in 2014. It was formally established by cabinet of Prime Minister Hailemariam Desalegn under regulation No. 916/2015. The institute provides various tasks relating to space science and aerospace technology. In December 2019, Ethiopia launched the first 70 kg multi-spectral remote sensing satellite. According to President Sahle-Work Zewde speech in October, the satellite "will provide all the necessary data on changes in climate and weather-related phenomena that would be utilized for the country’s key targets in agriculture, forestry as well as natural resources protection initiatives." By January 2020, satellite manufacturing, assembly, integration, and testing (MAIT) began and the French company would build facility funding from European Investment Bank (EIB). The MAIT facility in Ethiopia will positioned the country the first East Africa's space hub, while using costs from other sister satellites. Abdissa Yilma has been ESSTI's general director in 2021, and Yeshurun Alemayehu is deputy general director.

Science and Technology Information Center

The Science and Technology Information Center provides scientific and technological activity in the country, publishing information on financing research and development on process of innovative projects. It has facilities including digital library, patent information system, automated personnel management and databases. In 1977, the center planned to develop National Scientific and Technological Information and Documentation Center (NSTIDC). The institution designated as the highest body in agency for initiating, strengthening ad coordinating various facilities and services concerning the collection, organization and dissemination of scientific and technological information.

The center also aimed to produce biblometric monitoring of publication in 2014.

Traditional medicaments

Ethiopia's use of traditional medicine is highly intricate and varies from ethnic groups, implementing herbs, spiritual healing, bone-setting and minor surgical procedures for treating disease. In 849, the first epidemic occurred under the rule of Axumite emperor Abba Yohannes which evicted away from the land. The plague said to be "God's punishment for Yohannes for his misdeeds which invoke a divine response from terrified Abba Yohannes via letter, writing "great tribulations have come upon our land, and all our men are dying of the plague and all of our beasts and cattle have perished".

Although the birth of medicine widely believed to be unknown, it evolved from several stages of disease and pathological incidents throughout Ethiopian history. Most medical practices draw concept of "mystical" and natural causes of an illness employing ritualized religious treatment. Implementation of Western medicine came under Emperor Menelik II rule, with numerous medical envoys—mostly the Italians and Russians—were influential for building hospitals and medical trainings. The use of modern medicaments largely preserved by urban elites and foreign missionaries residing major cities.

Mathematics

Ethiopian mathematics has been dominated by number of aspects, including astrology, calendar and unit of measurement. Traditionally, Ethiopians used to measure weight using draft animals, or porter via sight in assumption rather than accurately defined logics. In modern sense, they also used steelyard and scale (also known in Ge'ez madalot (መድሎት) or madalew (መዳልው).

Other measurements includes in length and volume distinct from basic law, usually measured by using limbs. For example, Azq is unit distance by measuring tip of their index finger to the first fold (Angua). Sinzir also measured from the tip of the middle finger to the tip of the thumb while hand fully extended.

Ethiopia has long been known for horology, primarily in calendars. The Ethiopian calendar differs from Gregorian calendar by alternate calculation of Annunciation of Christ by 7 or 8 years. The calendar also adopted Coptic or Alexandrian calendar first calculated by Annianus of Alexandria. Another calendar, such as Borana calendar also developed in 300 BC based on lunar-stellar constellation.

Robotics

Robotics in Ethiopia is emerging with high tech companies contributed for various artificial intelligence (AI) works. Thus, it is thought to erase manufacturing jobs.

Computer programmer Betelhem Dessie founded iCog, a high tech AI company responsible for its contribution developing Sophia robot in 2016, becoming the youngest entrepreneur in the country. The robot made a landmark visit Ethiopia in July 2018, attracting many dignitaries at the Information & Communication Technology International Expo, in Addis Ababa. She also met with Prime Minister Abiy Ahmed on 2 July.

Science museum
On 4 October 2022, an Ethiopia Museum of Art and Science was opened in Addis Ababa, lying on 6.78 hectares with 1,500 meters square and 9 meters height and two floors. The science museum contains scientific and technological innovations and exhibitions with various halls, and cafeteria.

List of scientists

References